James Felt (January 4, 1926 – February 17, 2022) was an American philosopher and John Nobili Professor of Philosophy at the University of Santa Clara. He was a former president of the Metaphysical Society of America (2002).

References

1926 births
2022 deaths
20th-century American philosophers
Philosophy academics
Presidents of the Metaphysical Society of America
Santa Clara University faculty
Writers from Dallas